is a Japanese countertenor. His range is three and a half octaves.

Originally wanting to become a pop singer, Mera now primarily sings classical music from the West but also classical Japanese music. He appears frequently as a soloist with the Bach Collegium Japan, which under its conductor Masaaki Suzuki performs Baroque music. His 1998 recital disc "Nightingale" on Sweden's BIS Records was a major success in Japan.

It was revealed in a television documentary entitled "米良美一の實話" ("Yoshikazu Mela's true story") that he was born with congenital osteogenesis imperfecta.

Selected discography
Nightingale – Japanese Art Songs
Baroque Arias
Baroque Arias, vol. 2
The Best of Yoshikazu Mera
Princess Mononoke: Music from the Motion Picture (1997)
Songs for Counter-Tenor and Orchestra
Mera sings Bach

References

External links
Yoshikazu Mera sings Bach: Widerstehe doch der Sünde, BWV 54, I. Aria

Living people
1971 births
Musicians from Miyazaki Prefecture
Operatic countertenors
People with osteogenesis imperfecta
20th-century Japanese male singers
20th-century Japanese singers
21st-century Japanese male singers
21st-century Japanese singers